Naxa is a genus of moths in the family Geometridae described by Francis Walker in 1856.

Species
Naxa angustaria Leech, 1897 central China
Naxa guttulata Warren, 1894 Borneo, Sumatra
Naxa kerangatis Holloway, 1996 Borneo
Naxa seriaria (Motschulsky, 1866) Amur, Primorye, Japan, Korea, north-eastern China
Naxa taicoumaria (Orza, 1869) Japan
Naxa textilis Walker, 1856 Bangladesh

References

 
Moth genera